Sjoerd Pijbes Wiarda (in office 1399–1410) was the fifteenth potestaat (or elected governor) of Friesland now a province of the Netherlands.

Sjoerd Wiarda  born in 1355 and died in 1410. He was the son of Pybe Wyarda and Claer van Eminga. He lived on Wiarda estate at Goutum. He was the last potestaat to rule both Oostergo and Westergo.

Wiarda was the leader in the fight against the Count of Holland. In 1398 he was a delegate to the convention with Willem van Beijeren, Count of Holland. He was elected in 1399, succeeding Odo Botnia as potestaat. In 1400 he fought as a Schieringer in the Battle of Dokkum and Camminghastins.

Succession
In 1400 there were several potestaats chosen for Oostergo and Westergo because of the religious disputes between Schieringers and Vetkopers. Haring Haringsma or Haring thoe Heeg, forefather of the Harinxma family, was elected for Westergo.

References

Potestaats of Friesland
1355 births
1410 deaths